Christian Kennedy Nyazika (born 8 June 1956) is a former Zimbabwean cricket umpire. He stood in one ODI game in 2001.

See also
 List of One Day International cricket umpires

References

1956 births
Living people
Zimbabwean One Day International cricket umpires
Cricketers from Mutare